Amore-Attis (literally Love-Attis) is a c. 1440-1443 bronze sculpture by Donatello. It is 104 cm high and has traces of its originally gilding, it is now in the Museo del Bargello in Florence.

History
No documents survive to give the work's original location or commissioner, but it is probably the work referred to by Vasari as a Mercury exactly attributed to Donatello, described by him a "an arm and a half tall, sculpted in the round and dressed in a certain bizarre way" and stated to be in Agnolo Doni's house.

The poppy capsules on the belt symbolise sleep as well as being the heraldic symbol of the Bartolini Salimbeni family, though it has not yet been proven that that family definitely commissioned it. It was definitely not commissioned by Doni, since his family's fortunes were insufficient to commission such a fine bronze work, only rising in the 16th century. Its very particular iconography has not yet been fully explained but may suggest a very specific private commission, perhaps linked to cultured humanist circles in Florence.

In 1677 Cinelli wrote that he believed the work was a classical antiquity due to its pagan attributes and unbridled vital joy. It was also listed in a 17th century inventory of works at palazzo Doni on corso dei Tintori, locating it over a fireplace in a 'salotto' (living room) and calling it a 'Lucifer'. Giovanni Battista Doni owned it in the 17th century and sought opinions on its iconography from scholars and Roman antiquarians such as  Luca Holstenio and Giovan Pietro Bellori, who were the first to name it 'Attis'.

In the 18th century Pietro Bono Doni decided to sell the work to the Gallerie fiorentine for 600 scudi, with Giuseppe Pelli Bencivenni taking care of the neogtiations. On 25 June 1778 it was exhibited for the first time at the Uffizi as Ancient Idol. Its attribution, dataing and meaning were all then the subject of some debate. At that time Pelli Bencivenni had a drawing made by Francesco Marchissi and sent copies to major scholars of the era. Luigi Lanzi, then in Rome, showed it toEnnio Quirino Visconti and Maffei among others, who initially identified it as an ancient work, possibly showing Bacchus as a child. However, they then changed their mind and theorised that it was a modern work, finally accepting the attribution by Vasari in 1782. 

Later art historians have almost unanimously accepted this attribution to Donatello, dating it to the time between his trip to Rome in 1433 and his departure for Padua in 1443, when he created works showing a deep knowledge of Greek and Roman antiquity, such as his famed David. In his essay Ritorno Amore, Francesco Caglioti criticised the dating to 1436-1438, comparing the work to the two putti candle-holders now in the Musée Jacquemart-André. A 2001-2005 restoration revealed the original patina (with the wings a different colour to the body) and major traces of the original gilding.

Who?
The figure's wings are those of a cupid (a putto or Eros), while the leggings uncovering the buttocks and pubis are those of Attis. Other proposals for its identity are Perseus, Priapus, Mercury (according to Muntz), Harpocrates, a faun (according to Venturi), Cupid-Hercules, Mithras, Eros-Patheos, a personification of drunkeness, a child genius or a half-demon half-angel child spirit. Scalini proposed it showed "Conjugal Love Triumphing over Earth and Water", linking it to a marble base in the Victoria and Albert Museum and theorising they were both originally on a fountain built for the wedding festivities of Bernardo Rucellai and Nannina de' Medici in 1466. The decisive key would have been the object held in the figure's hand, lost since 1677. Edward Wind titled it "Multi-Formed Cupid" and stated "he has the face and wings of the classical Eros, he has Pan's tail, Attis's trousers, Hypnos's belt and Mercury's sandals".

References

External links
  
  

1440s sculptures
Sculptures by Donatello
Bronze sculptures in Florence
Sculptures of the Bargello
Sculptures of Greek gods
Sculptures of Cupid